Jelin-e Olya (also Romanized as Jelīn-e ‘Olyā; also known as Jelīn and Jelīn-e Bālā) is a city in Estarabad-e Jonubi Rural District, in the Central District of Gorgan County, Golestan Province, Iran. At the 2006 census, its population was 7,071, in 1,827 families.

References 

Populated places in Gorgan County
Cities in Golestan Province